Amélie Cazé (born 18 February 1985) is a French modern pentathlete. She won the Gold medal of the individual event at the 2007, 2008 and 2010 World Championships and 2009 and 2010 European Modern Pentathlon Championships.
 
She has represented France at the Summer Olympics in 2004, 2008 and 2012 and finished 12th 8th and 18th respectively.

References

External links
 
 
 

1985 births
Living people
French female modern pentathletes
Modern pentathletes at the 2004 Summer Olympics
Modern pentathletes at the 2008 Summer Olympics
Modern pentathletes at the 2012 Summer Olympics
Olympic modern pentathletes of France
World Modern Pentathlon Championships medalists
21st-century French women